Eupithecia interrubescens is a moth in the  family Geometridae. It is found in China (Tibet), Nepal, India and Pakistan.

References

Moths described in 1902
interrubescens
Moths of Asia